Daniel Dudas (born 20 April 1994) is a Hungarian swimmer. He competed in the men's 200 metre freestyle event at the 2018 FINA World Swimming Championships (25 m), in Hangzhou, China.

References

1994 births
Living people
Hungarian male swimmers
Hungarian male freestyle swimmers
Place of birth missing (living people)